Fálkinn was an Icelandic record label. The label's only well known original release was Björk's 1977 debut album Björk. Fálkinn is sometimes used as the title for the album as the album did not have an official title.

Fálkinn was also the local distributor of EMI, Polygram, and Island Records releases.

References
What Is Fálkinn?
Björk.com Discography

Icelandic record labels